Atego may refer to:

Atego (company) - former software company
Mercedes-Benz Atego - truck